Start a Fire may refer to:

 Start a Fire (Neon Trees EP)
 Start a Fire (BP Rania EP)
 "Start a Fire" (Tiffany Affair song), 2006
 "Start a Fire" (Ryan Star song), 2010
 "Start a Fire" (Dilara Kazimova song), 2014
 "Start a Fire" (Lil Wayne song), 2014
 "Start a Fire" (Margaret song), 2014, the official song of the 2014 FIVB Volleyball Men's World Championship
 "Start a Fire", a song in the La La Land soundtrack, 2016
 "Start a Fire", a song by Audio Adrenaline from Worldwide, 2003

See also 
 Firelighting, the process of artificially starting a fire
 Arson, crime of intentionally or maliciously igniting a fire
 Pyromania, disorder of pleasure to start fires
 Started a Fire, album by British band One Night Only
 How to Start a Fire, album by Further Seems Forever
 Start the Fire (disambiguation)
 Firestarter (disambiguation)